Geist  ("spirit") is a German term used in philosophy, in particular by Hegel.

Geist may also refer to:

Arts, entertainment and media
 Geist (DC Comics), a superhero appearing in Detective Comics
 Geist (Marvel Comics), a supervillain opponent of Wolverine
 Geist (magazine), a Canadian literary magazine
 Geist (video game), a Nintendo GameCube video game exclusively published by Nintendo
 Geist: The Sin-Eaters, a role-playing game published by White Wolf, Inc., involving undead creatures such as ghosts and heists
 Geist (album), a 2018 album by The Browning
 Geist, a 2021 album by Shannon Lay

Other uses
 Geist (liquor), a distilled beverage similar to fruit brandy
 Geist (surname)
 Geist, Indianapolis, an area in northeastern Indianapolis, Indiana, United States, named after Geist Reservoir, which it surrounds
 Geist, the German name for Apața Commune, Braşov County, Romania
 Geist (restaurant) restaurant in an NRHP blacksmith building in Nashville Tennessee